Loren Edgar Wheeler (October 7, 1862 – January 8, 1932) was a U.S. Representative from Illinois.

Born in Havana, Illinois, Wheeler attended the public schools and Graylock Institute, South Williamstown, Massachusetts. He moved to Springfield, Illinois, in 1880 and engaged in the ice and coal business until 1910 when he became identified with the advertising business. He served as member of the board of aldermen 1895-1897. He served as mayor of Springfield 1897-1901. He served as delegate to the Republican National Convention in 1900. Postmaster of Springfield 1901-1913.

Wheeler was elected as a Republican to the Sixty-fourth and to the three succeeding Congresses (March 4, 1915 - March 3, 1923). On April 5, 1917, he voted against declaring war on Germany. He served as chairman of the Committee on Railways and Canals (Sixty-sixth and Sixty-seventh Congresses). He was an unsuccessful candidate for reelection in 1922 to the Sixty-eighth Congress.

Wheeler was again elected to the Sixty-ninth Congress (March 4, 1925 - March 3, 1927). He was an unsuccessful candidate for reelection in 1926 to the Seventieth Congress. He continued his former business activities in Springfield, Illinois, until his death there on January 8, 1932. He was interred in Oak Ridge Cemetery.

References

1862 births
1932 deaths
Mayors of Springfield, Illinois
Republican Party members of the United States House of Representatives from Illinois
People from Havana, Illinois